The ganzá is a Brazilian rattle used as a percussion instrument, especially in samba music.

The ganzá is cylindrically shaped, and can be either a hand-woven basket or a metal canister which is filled with beads, metal balls, pebbles, or other similar items. Those made from metal produce a particularly loud sound. They are usually used to play a rhythm underneath the rest of the band.

It is usually included in the Brazilian Samba as an undertone.

The ganzá is classified as an indirectly struck idiophone.

See also
 Caxixi
 Chocalho

References 

Brazilian percussion
Vessel rattles